Panmure Island is a small  island of Canadian red sandstone island, with sand beaches, located off the east coast of Prince Edward Island in the Lot 61 township in Kings County.

The first visitors to Panmure Island were the Micmac First Nations Indians. The Micmac came to the island in the summer months to dig clams, mussels and quahaugs. The first full-time inhabitants of the island were settlers from Scotland, the first of which is believed to have been Andrew MacDonald and his family in 1805. The Panmure Island Cemetery was established in 1813.

Panmure Island was connected to Prince Edward Island by sand bars at low tide, but since the 1960s, an artificial causeway has carried a road to the island. The causeway also created an extensive barrier beach and sand dune formation, which is now protected by Panmure Island Provincial Park;  this park is not actually located on the island but along the causeway.  The causeway has faced increased wave erosion in recent years and the provincial government has spent a significant amount to preserve the connection despite rising sea levels and increased storms.

The island contains the oldest wooden lighthouse on Prince Edward Island, near the northern end of the causeway. Built in 1853, the historic  lighthouse structure has gabled windows and four stories with a warning beacon atop. It sits on the northeast shore alerting ships of the dangerous shoals that have been responsible for several shipwrecks in the region. Tours of the lighthouse are available in the summer months.

A school was built on the island in 1897 for $150, and had a total of seven pupils the first year.

The island is home to the community of Panmure Island, which derives its name from the island.

References

Islands of Prince Edward Island
Landforms of Kings County, Prince Edward Island